The Single Girls (also released under the titles Bloody Friday and Private School) is a 1974 exploitation film about a group of swingers at a Caribbean resort who are stalked by a mysterious killer. The film was directed by Beverly Sebastian and Ferd Sebastian, and stars Claudia Jennings, Jean Marie Ingels, and Greg Mullavey.

Plot
A group of men and women travel to a Caribbean resort to discover themselves sexually, but unfortunately one of them has also discovered that they like to murder people too.

Cast
Claudia Jennings - Allison
Jean Marie Ingels - Phyllis
Cheri Howell - Shannon (as Chéri Howell)
Joan Prather - Lola
Greg Mullavey - George
Edward Blessington - Bud (as Ed Blessington)
Victor Izay - Andrew
Wayne C. Dvorak - Dr. Phillip Stevens (as Wayne Dvorek)
Albert Popwell - Morris
Jason Ledger - Blue
Merci Montello - Cathy (as Mercy Rooney)
Robyn Hilton - Denise

Soundtrack
"Ms. America" - Written by Bobby Hart & Danny Janssen

See also
List of American films of 1974

External links
 

1974 films
American sexploitation films
1974 comedy-drama films
1974 horror films
American comedy-drama films
American slasher films
Films directed by Beverly Sebastian
Films directed by Ferd Sebastian
Dimension Pictures films
1970s English-language films
1970s American films